Mosebach is a surname. Notable people with the surname include:

 Bobby Mosebach (born 1984), American baseball player
 Karsten Mosebach (born 1969), German photographer and teacher
 Martin Mosebach (born 1951), German writer